The Selwyn College Preparatory School is a school in Denton, Texas. On January 21, 2012 the school's main building along with the kindergarten-5th grade classroom building burnt to the ground.

Selwyn will relocate to Argyle, Texas.

See also
 University-preparatory school

References

External links
 Selwyn College Preparatory School (official website)

Schools in Denton County, Texas
Private K-12 schools in Texas